King Arthur is an action-adventure game based on the 2004 film of the same title.

Gameplay

In the game the player can control Arthur and his friends. Usually each level has two players and one of them can be chosen by the player. The other one will be either computer controlled or controlled by second player. There are many characters including Arthur, Bors, Tristan, Lancelot, etc. The game follows the storyline of the film (with some minor alterations) .

Reception

The game received "mixed" reviews on all platforms according to the review aggregation website Metacritic.

References

External links

2004 video games
Action-adventure games
Disney Interactive
GameCube games
Konami games
Krome Studios games
Mobile games
PlayStation 2 games
Multiplayer and single-player video games
Video games based on Arthurian legend
Video games based on films
Video games scored by Jason Graves
Video games scored by Rod Abernethy
Video games developed in Australia
Video games developed in the United States
Video games set in the Middle Ages
Xbox games
Lavastorm games